Michael or Mike Morton may refer to:

 Michael Morton (American football) (born 1960), American football player
 Mike Morton (American football) (born 1972), American football player
 Michael Morton (criminal justice) (born 1954), American man wrongfully convicted of murder
 Michael Morton (dramatist) (1864–1931), English playwright
 Michael Morton (restaurateur) (born 1964), co-founder of the N9NE Group
 Michael Morton (runner) (born 1971), American ultramarathoner
 Michael Morton (soccer) (born 1989), South African soccer player
 Mike Morton (geologist) (1924–2003), British petroleum geologist
 Michael Scott Morton (born 1937), British business theorist
 Michael Morton, Canadian musician who records under the name Displacer